Sumbala or soumbala is a fermented seed condiment used widely across West Africa. It is usually prepared by women over the course of several days, traditionally from ' (Parkia biglobosa) seeds. It can be made from other kinds of seeds, such as those of Prosopis africana, and the use of soybeans for this purpose is increasing due mainly to inadequate supply of néré seeds. It is comparable to miso paste.

The fabrication process involves boiling, cleaning and then packing away to ferment - the fermentation process giving it a pungent smell. Salt can be added to the finished product to facilitate storage life.

This condiment is traditionally sold in balls or patties that can be kept for several months at a time in the case of the best quality. It is a traditional ingredient used across West Africa.

The traditional production now faces strong competition from low-quality stock cubes. Sumbala is rich in proteins and a variety of dietary minerals, which are completely absent from these bouillon cubes. In recent years, however, good quality commercial production has allowed the product to make a comeback into everyday cuisine.

Names and variants in several different languages of the region include:

 Hausa: , 
 Pulaar/Pular: 
 Yoruba: 
 Serer, Saafi, Wolof: 
 Krio: 
 Susu: 
 Zarma: 
 Dagbanli: 
 Mooré: 
 Konkomba language: ,

References

External links
Netetou - a typical African condiment: Food and Nutrition Library, United Nations University and the Humanity Libraries Project (1993)
Traditional recipe from "Sante diabete Mali".
LE NÉRÉ D'AFRIQUE ÉTUDIÉ À PLOUFRAGAN, Sciences Ouest, 1993, No. 93.

African cuisine
Condiments
Fermented foods
Yoruba cuisine
Hausa cuisine